The Bing Boys Are Here, styled "A Picture of London Life, in a Prologue and Six Panels," is the first of a series of revues which played at the Alhambra Theatre, London during the last two years of World War I. The series included The Bing Boys on Broadway and The Bing Girls Are There.  The music for them was written by Nat D. Ayer with lyrics by Clifford Grey, who also contributed to Yes, Uncle!, and the text was by George Grossmith, Jr. and Fred Thompson based on Rip and Bousquet's Le Fils Touffe.  Other material was contributed by Eustace Ponsonby, Philip Braham and Ivor Novello.

The Bing Boys Are Here opened in 1916 in the West End and ran for 378 performances. It was one of the three most important musical hits of the London stage during World War I (the other two being The Maid of the Mountains and Chu Chin Chow); music or scenes from all of these have been included as background in many films set in this period, and they remain intensely evocative of the "Great War" years.  Other hit shows of the period were Theodore & Co (1916), The Happy Day (1916), The Boy (1917), and Yes, Uncle! (1917).  Audiences, which included soldiers on leave, wanted light and uplifting entertainment during the war, and these shows delivered it.

Productions 
The revue first opened on 19 April 1916, at the Alhambra Theatre, starring George Robey and Violet Lorraine, famous for their introduction of the song "If You Were the Only Girl (in the World)," and Alfred Lester. It was replaced at the Alhambra on 24 February 1917, after 378 performances, by The Bing Girls Are There, with a different cast. It changed once again on 16 February 1918 to The Bing Boys on Broadway, with Robey returning to the cast. The total number of performances for all three revues was well over 1,000, lasting beyond the Armistice in November 1918. Recordings were made for the Columbia label in London by members of the original cast (Columbia L-1035). Odette Myrtil, playing her violin, also recorded "The Languid Melody" (Columbia L-1051).

The Bing Boys Are Here was revived at the Alhambra Theatre in December 1934 starring George Robey and Violet Lorraine. The revival featured substantial alterations to the original song list incorporating much entirely new repertoire by Grey and Ayer. The production then went on tour through 1935.

Songs 

Songs from the revues included:
 "In Other Words"
 "If You Were the Only Girl (in the World)"
 "I stopped, I looked, and I listened"
 "The Right Side of Bond Street"
 "A Lady of a Thousand Charms"
 "The Kipling Walk"
 "Another little drink wouldn't do us any harm"
 "Dear Old Shepherds Bush"
 "I Start My Day Over Again" (Clock Song)
 "First Love, Last Love"
 "Yula Hicki Wicki Yacki Dula"
 "Let the Great Big World keep Turning"
 "Come round London"
 "Ragging The Dog"
 "The Kiss Trot Dance"
 "The Languid Melody"
 "The Whistler"
 "Miss Crinoline"

Synopsis

B.W. Findon wrote in The Play Pictorial, no. 169, vol. XXVIII, "The Bing Boys Are Here edition", London, 1916, p. 50:

References 

Guinness Who's Who of Stage Musicals, editor Colin Larkin - 
Information from Footlightnotes

External links
List of longest running plays in London and New York
Cover of the original cast recording
Webpage includes MP3 files of many of the songs
The Bing Boys Are Here on Great War Theatre

1916 musicals
West End musicals
Musicals by Fred Thompson (writer)